Echo complement is a syntactic constituent that has either an anaphoric or a metonymic relation with another constituent in the same sentence.

Definition
The term seems to have been first used by Guillet and Leclère (1981, pp. 116–117), in the setting of the operation of NP restructuring, that is, a transformation linking the sentence types: N1 of N2 V = N2 V Prep N1, e.g. ‘The style/architecture of this house is very impressive’ = ‘This house is very impressive by/for its style/architecture’. 
The concept implies that the notion of appropriation (Harris 1976:113-115) between N1 (v.g. ‘style/architecture’), on one hand, and N2 as argument of V (v.g.) ‘house’ and ‘(be) impressive’, on the other hand, which results from the metonymy between N1 and N2.

Though briefly noted, the term was then used to designate a type of prepositional complement that renders more “precise” while recovering, at least partially, the meaning of the utterance (our translation). Even then, the authors considered the notion could be extended to other types of prepositional complements such as: 
- moi-même ‘myself’ in J’ai fait ça (de/par) moi-même ‘I have done this myself’, where a redundant reflexive pronoun reinstates the subject NP; or
- in J’ai un apartment à moi ‘I have my own apartment/I have an apartment of my own’, where a redundant/emphatic oblique pronoun (in French) recovers both the subject NP and the possession relation of avoir ‘to have’. The same term and analysis are more recently retaken by Laporte (2004).

In another work (Guillet and Leclère 1992, p. 109), the authors use the term in yet another syntactic setting, v.g. mettre du beurre sur = beurrer ‘to put butter over/on = to butter’, where mettre 'put' is analysed as a support-verb. This relation, however, could correspond to the Fusion operation. Theoretical considerations apart, the relevant observation is that the verbal sentence allows a prepositional complement with the noun whence the verb is derived (V-n). This complements usually zeroed unless it is given a specifying modifier, e.g. Max beurre sa tar tine de de beurre (salé/de ferme) ‘Max buttered his toast with salted/farm butter’.

Use in Portuguese
The term has been adopted for Portuguese by Baptista (2005b, pp. 157–162), to name apparently facultative human complements introduced by compound preposition para com ‘towards’ (lit:‘for with’), in support verb constructions, e.g. O gesto do Pedro para com o João foi de uma grande delicadeza = O gesto do Pedro foi de uma grande delicadeza para com o João ‘Peter’s gesture towards John was of great delicacy = Peter’s gesture was of great delicacy towards John’. 
Nevertheless, in the same work (Baptista 2005b, p. 165), when referring to the distinction between symmetrical and reciprocal constructions, calls the type of complement here addressed, pronominal copy.

Other uses
While other authors, namely Guillet and Leclère (1992), Laporte (2004), and Baptista (2005a,b), may have used the term echo complement to describe different linguistic phenomena, and apparently have not used it for the specific type of complement here addressed, the term could fit the first definition provided by Guillet and Leclère (1981, pp. 116–117). Though briefly noted, the term was then used to designate a type of prepositional complement that “renders more “precise” while recovering, at least partially, the meaning of the utterance” (our translation).

More recently (Baptista 2005a), the term was used for anaphoric expressions in reciprocal constructions, analysable as the result of the reduction of two coordinated sentences with same predicate but with two constituents in symmetrical position:

Peter talked with John and John talked with Peter → Peter and John talked with each other

References 

Grammar